The PKP class EP03 (manufacturer's designation: ASEA E150) is a type of electric locomotive used by Polish railway operator Polskie Koleje Państwowe (PKP).

History 
In 1946 PKP purchased eight locomotives from the Swedish manufacturer Allmänna Svenska Elektriska Aktiebolaget (ASEA) of a type not used in Sweden.

Introduction 
The locomotives were introduced in 1951–1952. They were designated EP03 class according to PKP system, and numbered EP03-01 to EP03-08. Their main purpose was operating light passenger and freight trains.

Locomotive assignment

Withdrawal 
The EP03 locomotives were in service until about 1970; the last of the class was withdrawn in 1974.

Present use 
The only locomotive in operation is EP03-01, preserved in the railway museum in Chabówka.

See also 
Polish locomotives designation

External links 

Modern Locos Gallery
Rail Service
Mikoleje
Chabówka Rail Museum

Railway locomotives introduced in 1951
ASEA locomotives
Bo′Bo′ locomotives
3000 V DC locomotives
EP03
Standard gauge locomotives of Poland